Robert Robertson Innes Cunning (12 February 1930 – 24 January 1983) was a Scottish professional footballer who played as a winger for Sunderland, Hamilton Academical and Rangers.

References

1930 births
1983 deaths
Footballers from Dunfermline
Scottish footballers
Association football wingers
Port Glasgow Athletic F.C. players
Sunderland A.F.C. players
Hamilton Academical F.C. players
Rangers F.C. players
English Football League players
Scottish Football League players